Yuly Andreyevich Rybakov (born 25 February 1946) is a Russian human rights activist, a former member of the State Duma (1993–2003), a former Chairman of the Subcommittee on Human Rights (2000–2003), the founder of the magazine "Terra incognita", a former political prisoner.

Biography
Rybakov was born in 1946 in Mariinsk, Kemerovo Oblast in Siberia, at a camp for political prisoners, to a family of naval officers from Saint Petersburg. His parents were illegally purged. In 1974, Rybakov finished art school, college, and later studied at the Ilya Repin Leningrad Institute for Painting.

He was arrested by the KGB in 1976 for taking part in the dissident movement for human rights, as well as the distribution of Aleksandr Solzhenitsyn's books, leaflets and creating slogans (such as the inscription on the wall of the bastion of the Czar's Peter and Paul Fortress: "you may crucify freedom, but the human soul knows no shackles"). He was arrested under the 70th ("anti-Soviet") article of the Criminal Code. Rybakov was convicted for a particularly daring act of "hooliganism" and embezzlement to 6 years imprisonment at a stronger prison regime. In 1982, he returned to Leningrad and studied law. In 1988, he became one of the organizers and leaders of the Leningrad branch of the Democratic Union Party, which stated publicly its goal to eliminate the Communist Party's monopoly on power and establish democracy in Russia.

In 1990, he was elected to the Leningrad City Council, and organized the first state commission on human rights. In 1993, Rybakov was elected to the State Duma. After the death of Galina Starovoytova, he headed the Democratic Russia Party. He resigned as chairman in October 2000. In the same year, he was elected to the State Duma of III convocation. In March 2010, he signed an address of the Russian opposition, entitled Putin Must Go.

Events in Budennovsk
In 1995, in the midst of Budyonnovsk hospital hostage crisis, Rybakov, together with the State Duma Sergei Kovalev and Viktor Kurochkin, on behalf of Prime Minister Viktor Chernomyrdin negotiated with Shamil Basayev, who seized the hospital. The talks failed to agree on the release of most hostages – to ensure the safety of terrorists along with them on the buses back to Chechnya, only 140 volunteers were to go, including negotiators. In the village of Zandag, Rybakov was released along with the other hostages.

Advocacy of Human Rights
In 1990, Rybakov created the first Soviet Human Rights Commission. Member of the International Society for Human Rights, the editorial board of the journals "The Edge" and "Seeding" partnership "Free Culture".

During the war in Chechnya from 1996–1999, Rybakov participated in the liberation of 2,500 servicemen who were in Chechen captivity.

From 2000 to 2003, he was chairman of the Subcommittee on Human Rights of the State Duma.

Since 2006, he was member of the Yabloko Party, co-chair the human rights group in the party Yabloko.

Since 2007, he has not been in a political party.

In June 2007, the "Human Rights Council of St. Petersburg" was formed, which included several human rights organizations and defenders such as Rybakov, Yuriy Nesterov, Natalia Evdokimova and Leonid Romankov.

Awards
 Order of Saint John (Maltese Cross)

References

Sources

External links
 Rybakov's website "Human rights" (Russian/English)
 Law and Order – Terra incognita (Human Rights Almanac) (Russian)
 Interview on the book of memoirs on Radio Liberty
 Article on the book of memoirs "My Century" by Yuly Rybakov on "Novaya Gazeta" (Russian)
 The "Soloveckii Stone" in St. Petersburg set up two artists (Russian/English)
 Members of the "Human Rights Council of St. Petersburg" (Russian)
 The "Soloveckii Stone" in St. Petersburg (Russian/English)

1946 births
Living people
People from Kemerovo Oblast
Yabloko politicians
Russian activists
Russian activists against the 2022 Russian invasion of Ukraine
Russian dissidents
Russian human rights activists
Soviet dissidents
First convocation members of the State Duma (Russian Federation)
Second convocation members of the State Duma (Russian Federation)
Third convocation members of the State Duma (Russian Federation)